Jona is a Bangladeshi film actress who acted in more than 40 films.

Biography
Jona made her debut in Dhallywood with Hridoyer Bashi where her co-star was Shakil Khan.

Jona's first marriage with Shakil Khan did not last long. Then she married Zubayer Hossain on 14 February 2009. Jona is now living in the United States.

Selected filmography
 Hridoyer Bashi (2002)
 Doctor Bari
 Biyer Logon
 Bazao Biyer Bazna
 Jonmo
 Mon Chhuyechhe Mon

References

Living people
Bangladeshi film actresses
Year of birth missing (living people)